Carlos Alberto Ricardo is a Brazilian environment pioneer. He was awarded the Goldman Environmental Prize in 1992, for his contribution to environment policy in Brazil.

References 

Year of birth missing (living people)
Living people
Brazilian environmentalists
Goldman Environmental Prize awardees